Lehlogonolo "Hlogi" Sechaba Tholo (born 12 November 1992) is a South African basketball player for Cape Town Tigers and the South Africa national basketball team.

Professional career
In the 2021 season, Tholo played with the Soweto Panthers. With the Panthers, he reached the BNL Final in which he recorded 25 points, 5 rebounds in 7 assists. As a result, Tholo was named the Final MVP.

Since 2021, Tholo is on the roster of the Cape Town Tigers.

National team career
Tholo has played for the South Africa national basketball team. He played with the team at AfroBasket 2017. On Gameday 2, he had 12 points in the game against Mozambique.

References

External links

1992 births
Living people
South African basketball players
Point guards
Cape Town Tigers players
Soweto Panthers players
Egoli Magic players
Sportspeople from Pretoria